Nemzeti Bajnokság I (commonly abbreviated NB I) is the premier  futsal league in Hungary, administered by the Hungarian Football Federation.  The league, which is played under UEFA rules, was founded in 1993 and currently consists of 12 teams.

Teams 2020/21
 MVFC Berettyóújfalu
 Haladás VSE
 Futsal Veszprém
 Dunaferr DUE Dutrade FC
 Nyírgyulaj KSE
 Rubeola FC Csömör
 Debreceni Egyetemi AC
 Aramis SE
 FTC-Fisher Klíma
 Scoregoal Kecskeméti Futsal

Champions

Championship titles by teams 
 8x: Győri ETO Futsal Club
 4x: MVFC Berettyóújfalu
 3x: Aramis SE, Cső-Montage BFC
 2x: Gödöllői FK, Haladás VSE, Külker FC, Lőrinc FC, Nestle
 1x: Rubeola FC Csömör

References

External links
 futsal.hu

Futsal competitions in Hungary
futsal
Hungary
1993 establishments in Hungary
Sports leagues established in 1993
Professional sports leagues in Hungary